The primeval splayfoot salamander (Chiropterotriton priscus), also known as the primeval flat-footed salamander, is a species of salamander in the family Plethodontidae. It is endemic to Mexico and known from near its type locality on Cerro Potosí in Nuevo León as well as from adjacent Coahuila, at elevations above  asl. Its natural habitats are pine and pine-fir forests. It is a terrestrial species found under fallen logs and under bark.

The species is still abundant, but its range is small and there is a risk of habitat loss through logging.

References

Chiropterotriton
Endemic amphibians of Mexico
Fauna of the Sierra Madre Oriental
Amphibians described in 1956
Taxa named by George B. Rabb
Taxonomy articles created by Polbot